This is a list of members of the 7th Bundestag – the lower house of parliament of the Federal Republic of Germany, whose members were in office from 1972 until 1976.



Summary 
This summary includes changes in the numbers of the three caucuses (CDU/CSU, SPD, FDP):

Members

A 

 Manfred Abelein, CDU
 Ernst Achenbach, FDP
 Rudi Adams, SPD
 Conrad Ahlers, SPD
 Karl Ahrens, SPD
 Heinrich Aigner, CSU
 Siegbert Alber, CDU
 Odal von Alten-Nordheim, CDU
 Walter Althammer, CSU
 Max Amling, SPD
 Franz Amrehn, CDU
 Jürgen Anbuhl, SPD
 Hans Apel, SPD
 Walter Arendt, SPD
 Klaus Dieter Arndt, SPD  (until 29 January 1974)
 Claus Arndt, SPD  (from 20 May 1974)
 Gottfried Arnold, CDU
 Helmut Artzinger, CDU
 Rudolf Augstein, FDP  (until 24 January 1973)
 Hans-Jürgen Augstein, SPD

B 

 Herbert Baack, SPD
 Egon Bahr, SPD
 Fritz Baier, CDU
 Martin Bangemann, FDP
 Hermann Barche, SPD
 Hans Bardens, SPD
 Rainer Barzel, CDU
 Hans Batz, SPD
 Willi Bäuerle, SPD
 Gerhart Baum, FDP
 Alfons Bayerl, SPD
 Walter Becher, CSU
 Curt Becker, CDU
 Helmuth Becker, SPD
 Friedrich Beermann, SPD  (until 24 November 1975)
 Walter Behrendt, SPD
 Ursula Benedix, CDU
 Gerold Benz, CDU
 Lieselotte Berger, CDU
 Urich Berger, CDU
 Karl Wilhelm Berkhan, SPD  (until 19 March 1975)
 Karl Bewerunge, CDU
 Hermann Biechele, CDU
 Alfred Biehle, CSU
 Günter Biermann, SPD
 Kurt Birrenbach, CDU
 Philipp von Bismarck, CDU
 Bertram Blank, SPD
 Norbert Blüm, CDU
 Erik Blumenfeld, CDU
 Helmut von Bockelberg, CDU
 Rolf Böger, FDP  (from 25 January 1973)
 Wilfried Böhm, CDU
 Rolf Böhme, SPD
 Holger Börner, SPD  (until 22 October 1976)
 Lenelotte von Bothmer, SPD
 Hugo Brandt, SPD
 Willy Brandt, SPD
 Gerhard Braun, CDU
 Wenzel Bredl, SPD
 Ferdinand Breidbach, CDU
 Rolf Bremer, CDU
 Klaus Bremm, CDU
 Alwin Brück, SPD
 Hans Büchler, SPD
 Peter Büchner, SPD
 Werner Buchstaller, SPD
 Reinhard Bühling, SPD
 Andreas von Bülow, SPD
 Fritz Burgbacher, CDU
 Albert Burger, CDU
 Hermann Buschfort, SPD
 Bernhard Bußmann, SPD

C 

 Karl Carstens, CDU
 Manfred Carstens, CDU
 Herbert Christ, FDP
 Hugo Collet, SPD
 Peter Conradi, SPD
 Manfred Coppik, SPD
 Peter Corterier, SPD
 Herbert Czaja, CDU

D 

 Carl Damm, CDU
 Herta Däubler-Gmelin, SPD
 Rembert van Delden, CDU
 Klaus von Dohnanyi, SPD
 Werner Dollinger, CSU
 Alfred Dregger, CDU
 Nicolaus Dreyer, CDU
 Ulrich Dübber, SPD
 Hermann Dürr, SPD

E 

 Günther Eckerland, SPD
 Jürgen Egert, SPD
 Horst Ehmke, SPD
 Herbert Ehrenberg, SPD
 Karl Eigen, CDU
 Elfriede Eilers, SPD
 Jan Eilers, CDU
 Dietrich Elchlepp, SPD  (from 4 June 1976)
 Hans-Uwe Emeis, SPD  (from 8 December 1975)
 Alfred Emmerlich, SPD
 Wendelin Enders, SPD
 Hans A. Engelhard, FDP
 Matthias Engelsberger, CSU
 Björn Engholm, SPD
 Otto Entrup, CDU
 Erhard Eppler, SPD  (until 3 June 1976)
 Benno Erhard, CDU
 Ludwig Erhard, CDU
 Leo Ernesti, CDU
 Josef Ertl, FDP
 Helmut Esters, SPD
 Hans Evers, CDU
 Carl Ewen, SPD
 Richard Ey, CDU
 Heinz Eyrich, CDU

F 

 Friedhelm Farthmann, SPD  (until 5 June 1975)
 Ludwig FellerMayer, SPD
 Werner Ferrang, CDU  (until 31 May 1974)
 Udo Fiebig, SPD
 Otto Freiherr von Fircks, CDU
 Willi Fischer, SPD
 Karl-Hermann Flach, FDP  (until 25 August 1973)
 Gerhard Flämig, SPD
 Katharina Focke, SPD
 Egon Franke, SPD
 Heinrich Franke, CDU
 Ludwig Franz, CSU
 Heinz Frehsee, SPD
 Friedrich Freiwald, CDU  (until 26 October 1974)
 Göke Frerichs, CDU  (until 15 January 1975)
 Bruno Friedrich, SPD
 Isidor Früh, CDU
 Karl Fuchs, CSU
 Liselotte Funcke, FDP

G 

 Georg Gallus, FDP
 Norbert Gansel, SPD
 Erna-Maria Geier, CDU  (from 5 March 1976)
 Hans Geiger, SPD
 Franz Xaver Geisenhofer, CSU
 Karl Geldner, FDP
 Hans-Dietrich Genscher, FDP
 Horst Gerlach, SPD
 Paul Gerlach, CSU
 Johannes Gerster, CDU
 Friedrich Gerstl, SPD
 Hans Gertzen, SPD
 Manfred Geßner, SPD
 Heinrich Gewandt, CDU
 Karl Heinz Gierenstein, CSU
 Eugen Glombig, SPD
 Peter Glotz, SPD
 Fritz-Joachim Gnädinger, SPD
 Georg Gölter, CDU
 Hermann Götz, CDU
 Carlo Graaff, FDP  (until 9 December 1975)
 Johann Baptist Gradl, CDU
 Karl Martin Graß, CDU  (from 13 April 1976)
 Jürgen Grimming, SPD  (from 18 June 1975)
 Claus Grobecker, SPD
 Rötger Groß, FDP  (until 5 July 1974)
 Herbert Gruhl, CDU
 Horst Grunenberg, SPD
 Martin Grüner, FDP
 Angela Grützmann, SPD  (from 2 February 1974)

H 

 Dieter Haack, SPD
 Ernst Haar, SPD
 Detlef Haase, SPD
 Horst Haase, SPD
 Lothar Haase, CDU
 Ingeborg Häckel, CDU  (from 28 September 1976)
 Karl Haehser, SPD
 Frank Haenschke, SPD
 Hansjörg Häfele, CDU
 Friedhelm Halfmeier, SPD
 Hugo Hammans, CDU
 Franz Handlos, CSU
 Karl-Heinz Hansen, SPD
 Kurt Härzschel, CDU  (until 23 September 1976)
 Kai-Uwe von Hassel, CDU
 Rudolf Hauck, SPD
 Volker Hauff, SPD
 Alo Hauser, CDU
 Hansheinz Hauser, CDU
 Hugo Hauser, CDU
 Bruno Heck, CDU
 Erich Henke, SPD
 Rudolf Herbers, SPD  (from 12 May 1976)
 Hans Hermsdorf, SPD  (until 30 May 1974)
 Karl Herold, SPD
 Roelf Heyen, SPD  (until 5 June 1975)
 Burkhard Hirsch, FDP  (until 5 June 1975)
 Hermann Höcherl, CSU
 Klaus-Jürgen Hoffie, FDP
 Karl Hofmann, SPD
 Egon Höhmann, SPD
 Friedrich Hölscher, FDP
 Uwe Holtz, SPD
 Hans-Günter Hoppe, FDP
 Erwin Horn, SPD
 Karl-Heinz Hornhues, CDU
 Martin Horstmeier, CDU
 Alex Hösl, CSU
 Antje Huber, SPD
 Gunter Huonker, SPD
 Herbert Hupka, CDU
 Agnes Hürland, CDU
 Dieter Hussing, CDU  (from 16 November 1973)

I 

 Klaus Immer, SPD

J 

 Richard Jaeger, CSU
 Claus Jäger, CDU
 Hans Edgar Jahn, CDU
 Friedrich-Adolf Jahn, CDU
 Gerhard Jahn, SPD
 Günter Jaschke, SPD
 Horst Jaunich, SPD
 Philipp Jenninger, CDU
 Uwe Jens, SPD
 Dionys Jobst, CSU
 Johann Peter Josten, CDU
 Kurt Jung, FDP
 Hans-Jürgen Junghans, SPD
 Heinrich Junker, SPD

K 

 Rudolf Kaffka, SPD
 Georg Kahn-Ackermann, SPD  (until 18 September 1974)
 Helmut Kater, SPD
 Hans Katzer, CDU
 Friedrich Kempfler, CSU
 Karl-Hans Kern, SPD
 Ignaz Kiechle, CSU
 Walther Leisler Kiep, CDU  (until 24 February 1976)
 Kurt Georg Kiesinger, CDU
 Victor Kirst, FDP
 Hans Hugo Klein, CDU
 Josef Klein, CDU
 Detlef Kleinert, FDP
 Egon Klepsch, CDU
 Georg Kliesing, CDU
 Kurt Koblitz, SPD
 Herbert W Köhler, CDU
 Volkmar Köhler, CDU
 Klaus Konrad, SPD
 Gottfried Köster, CDU
 Lothar Krall, FDP
 Wilhelm Krampe, CDU
 Konrad Kraske, CDU
 Paul Kratz, SPD
 Friedrich Kreibaum, FDP  (from 15 December 1975)
 Reinhold Kreile, CSU
 Heinz Kreutzmann, SPD
 Horst Krockert, SPD
 Hermann Kroll-Schlüter, CDU
 Knut von Kühlmann-Stumm, CDU
 Alwin Kulawig, SPD
 Gerhard Kunz, CDU
 Max Kunz, CSU

L 

 Karl-Hans Laermann, FDP  (from 28 June 1974)
 Karl-Hans Lagershausen, CDU
 Uwe Lambinus, SPD
 Otto Graf Lambsdorff, FDP
 Egon Lampersbach, CDU
 Erwin Lange, SPD
 Dieter Lattmann, SPD
 Lauritz Lauritzen, SPD
 Hans Lautenschlager, SPD
 Georg Leber, SPD
 Albert Leicht, CDU
 Karl Heinz Lemmrich, CSU
 Hans Lemp, SPD
 Helmut Lenders, SPD
 Carl Otto Lenz, CDU
 Christian Lenzer, CDU
 Renate Lepsius, SPD
 Karl Liedtke, SPD
 Helmut Link, CDU
 Josef Löbbert, SPD
 Lothar Löffler, SPD
 Fritz Logemann, FDP
 Paul Löher, CDU
 Ulrich Lohmar, SPD
 Hans August Lücker, CSU
 Manfred Luda, CDU
 Barbara Lüdemann, FDP  (from 4 September 1973)
 Egon Lutz, SPD

M 

 Erhard Mahne, SPD
 Peter Männing, SPD  (from 19 June 1975)
 Werner Marquardt, SPD
 Manfred Marschall, SPD
 Berthold Martin, CDU  (until 12 November 1973)
 Anke Martiny-Glotz, SPD
 Werner Marx, CDU
 Hans Matthöfer, SPD
 Kurt Mattick, SPD
 Eugen Maucher, CDU
 Werner Mayhofer, FDP
 Hedwig Meermann, SPD
 Rolf Meinecke, SPD
 Erich Meinike, SPD
 Linus Memmel, CSU
 Erich Mende, CDU
 Alois Mertes, CDU
 Werner Mertes, FDP
 Günther Metzger, SPD
 Josef Mick, CDU
 Paul Mikat, CDU
 Karl Miltner, CDU
 Peter Milz, CDU
 Wolfgang Mischnick, FDP
 Karl Moersch, FDP
 Helmuth Möhring, SPD
 Jürgen Möllemann, FDP
 Alex Möller, SPD
 Heiner Möller, CDU
 Adolf Müller, CDU
 Günther Müller, CSU
 Heinrich Müller, SPD
 Johannes Müller, CDU
 Richard Müller, SPD
 Rudolf Müller, SPD
 Willi Müller, SPD
 Adolf Müller-Emmert, SPD
 Ernst Müller-Hermann, CDU
 Franz Müntefering, SPD  (from 10 June 1975)
 Karl-Heinz Mursch, CDU

N 

 Werner Nagel, SPD
 Karl-Heinz Narjes, CDU
 Paul Neumann, SPD
 Hanna Neumeister, CDU
 Lorenz Niegel, CSU
 Wilhelm Nölling, SPD  (until 20 May 1974)
 Franz-Josef Nordlohne, CDU

O 

 Hermann Oetting, SPD
 Rainer Offergeld, SPD
 Martin Oldenstädt, CDU
 Alfred Ollesch, FDP
 Rudolf Opitz, FDP
 Gerhard Orgaß, CDU
 Elisabeth Orth, SPD  (until 10 May 1976)
 Wilderich Freiherr Ostman von der Leye, SPD

P 

 Doris Pack, CDU  (from 1 June 1974)
 Alfons Pawelczyk, SPD
 Willi Peiter, SPD
 Willfried Penner, SPD
 Heinz Pensky, SPD
 Helwin Peter, SPD  (from 10 June 1974)
 Walter Peters, FDP  (from 13 June 1975)
 Gerhard O Pfeffermann, CDU
 Anton Pfeifer, CDU
 Walter Picard, CDU
 Elmar Pieroth, CDU
 Liselotte Pieser, CDU
 Eberhard Pohlmann, CDU
 Walter Polkehn, SPD
 Konrad Porzner, SPD
 Helmut Prassler, CDU  (until 3 November 1975)
 Albert Probst, CSU

R 

 Alois Rainer, CSU
 Heinz Rapp, SPD
 Hermann Rappe, SPD
 Karl Ravens, SPD
 Wilhelm Rawe, CDU
 Gerhard Reddemann, CDU
 Wiltrud Rehlen, SPD  (from 14 November 1974)
 Hermann P Reiser, SPD
 Annemarie Renger, SPD
 Peter Reuschenbach, SPD
 Klaus Richter, SPD
 Paula Riede, CDU
 Erich Riedl, CSU
 Gerd Ritgen, CDU
 Burkhard Ritz, CDU
 Helmut Rohde, SPD
 Siegfried Röhlig, SPD  (from 19 March 1975)
 Paul Röhner, CSU
 Dietrich Rollmann, CDU
 Josef Rommerskirchen, CDU
 Uwe Ronneburger, FDP  (until 12 June 1975)
 Philip Rosenthal, SPD
 Hans Roser, CSU
 Hermann Josef Russe, CDU

S 

 Engelbert Sander, SPD
 Helmut Sauer, CDU
 Franz Sauter, CDU
 Karl-Heinz Saxowski, SPD
 Botho Prinz zu Sayn-Wittgenstein-Hohenstein, CDU
 Hans Georg Schachtschabel, SPD
 Harald B Schäfer, SPD
 Friedrich Schäfer, SPD
 Wolfgang Schäuble, CDU
 Albert Schedl, CSU
 Walter Scheel, FDP  (until 27 June 1974)
 Hermann Scheffler, SPD
 Ernst Schellenberg, SPD
 Franz Ludwig Schenk Graf von Stauffenberg, CSU
 Martin Schetter, CDU  (from 3 November 1975)
 Adolf Scheu, SPD
 Hildegard Schimschok, SPD
 Dieter Schinzel, SPD
 Friedel Schirmer, SPD
 Georg Schlaga, SPD
 Marie Schlei, SPD
 Ursula Schleicher, CSU
 Eckhard Schleifenbaum, FDP  (from 5 June 1975)
 Günter Schluckebier, SPD
 Peter Schmidhuber, CSU
 Manfred Schmidt, CDU  (from 17 January 1975)
 Adolf Schmidt, SPD
 Hansheinrich Schmidt, FDP
 Helmut Schmidt, SPD
 Hermann Schmidt, SPD
 Manfred Schmidt, SPD
 Martin Schmidt, SPD
 Wolfgang Schmidt, SPD
 Josef Schmitt, CDU
 Hermann Schmitt-Vockenhausen, SPD
 Hans Peter Schmitz, CDU
 Hans Werner Schmöle, CDU
 Jürgen Schmude, SPD
 Oscar Schneider, CSU
 Andreas von Schoeler, FDP
 Rudolf Schöfberger, SPD
 Friedrich Schonhofen, SPD
 Heinz Schreiber, SPD
 Diedrich Schröder, CDU
 Gerhard Schröder, CDU
 Horst Schröder, CDU
 Christa Schroeder, CDU
 Helga Schuchardt, FDP
 Dieter Schulte, CDU
 Manfred Schulte, SPD
 Klaus-Peter Schulz, CDU
 Max Schulze-Vorberg, CSU
 Wolfgang Schwabe, SPD
 Rolf Schwedler, SPD
 Carl-Christoph Schweitzer, SPD
 Olaf Schwencke, SPD
 Wolfgang Schwenk, SPD  (from 3 June 1974)
 Hermann Schwörer, CDU
 Horst Seefeld, SPD
 Philipp Seibert, SPD
 Rudolf Seiters, CDU
 Willi-Peter Sick, CDU
 Hellmut Sieglerschmidt, SPD
 Paul Heinrich Simon, SPD
 Hansmartin Simpfendörfer, SPD
 Günter Slotta, SPD  (until 9 June 1974)
 Emil Solke, CDU
 Dietrich Sperling, SPD
 Adolf Freiherr Spies von Büllesheim, CDU
 Karl-Heinz Spilker, CSU
 Hermann Spillecke, SPD
 Kurt Spitzmüller, FDP
 Carl-Dieter Spranger, CSU
 Gerd Springorum, CDU
 Rudolf Sprung, CDU
 Werner Staak, SPD  (until 13 November 1974)
 Erwin Stahl, SPD
 Hermann Stahlberg, CDU  (from 1 November 1974)
 Anton Stark, CDU
 Heinz Starke, CSU
 Lutz Stavenhagen, CDU
 Waltraud Steinhauer, SPD  (from 9 December 1974)
 Karl-Heinz Stienen, SPD
 Maria Stommel, CDU
 Günter Straßmeir, CDU
 Franz Josef Strauß, CSU
 Richard Stücklen, CSU
 Walter Suck, SPD
 Olaf Sund, SPD
 Egon Susset, CDU

T 

 Hans-Adolf de Terra, CDU
 Kurt Thürk, CDU
 Günther Tietjen, SPD  (from 12 September 1974)
 Ferdinand Tillmann, CDU
 Helga Timm, SPD
 Jürgen Todenhöfer, CDU
 Albert Tönjes, SPD
 Irma Tübler, CDU

U 

 Hermann Josef Unland, CDU
 Hans-Eberhard Urbaniak, SPD

V 

 Jürgen Vahlberg, SPD
 Max Vehar, CDU
 Roswitha Verhülsdonk, CDU
 Franz Vit, SPD
 Friedrich Vogel, CDU
 Hans-Jochen Vogel, SPD
 Kurt Vogelsang, SPD
 Wolfgang Vogt, CDU
 Manfred Vohrer, FDP
 Karsten Voigt, SPD  (from 28 October 1976)
 Günter Volmer, CDU

W 

 Horst Waffenschmidt, CDU
 Carl-Ludwig Wagner, CDU  (until 8 April 1976)
 Leo Wagner, CSU
 Theodor Waigel, CSU
 Karl-Heinz Walkhoff, SPD
 Walter Wallmann, CDU
 Ernst Waltemathe, SPD
 Rudi Walther, SPD
 Hanna Walz, CDU
 Jürgen Warnke, CSU
 Kurt Wawrzik, CDU
 Hubert Weber, SPD
 Karl Weber, CDU
 Herbert Wehner, SPD
 Richard von Weizsäcker, CDU
 Manfred Wende, SPD
 Friedrich Wendig, FDP
 Martin Wendt, SPD
 Herbert Werner, CDU
 Axel Wernitz, SPD
 Heinz Westphal, SPD
 Helga Wex, CDU
 Günter Wichert, SPD  (until 10 September 1974)
 Bruno Wiefel, SPD
 Karl Wienand, SPD  (until 3 December 1974)
 Werner Wilhelm, SPD
 Waltrud Will-Feld, CDU
 Manfred Wimmer, SPD  (from 18 September 1974)
 Heinrich Windelen, CDU
 Hans-Jürgen Wischnewski, SPD
 Hans Wissebach, CDU
 Hans de With, SPD
 Fritz Wittmann, CSU
 Otto Wittmann, SPD
 Jürgen Wohlrabe, CDU
 Erika Wolf, CDU
 Willi Wolf, SPD
 Torsten Wolfgramm, FDP  (from 5 July 1974)
 Erich Wolfram, SPD
 Manfred Wörner, CDU
 Olaf Baron von Wrangel, CDU
 Lothar Wrede, SPD
 Otto Wulff, CDU
 Richard Wurbs, FDP
 Gottfried Wurche, SPD  (until 3 June 1975)
 Peter Würtz, SPD
 Kurt Wüster, SPD
 Günther Wuttke, SPD
 Johann Wuwer, SPD

Z 

 Fred Zander, SPD
 Franz Josef Zebisch, SPD
 Gerhard Zeitel, CDU
 Werner Zeitler, SPD
 Werner Zeyer, CDU
 Erich Ziegler, CSU
 Friedrich Zimmermann, CSU
 Otto Zink, CDU
 Siegfried Zoglmann, CSU
 Werner Zywietz, FDP

See also 

 Politics of Germany
 List of Bundestag Members

07